Kristofer Allerfeldt is a British historian and farmer. He teaches History at the University of Exeter.

Career

Allerfeldt's research focuses on the history of racism, nationalism and organised crime in the United States, and the creation of modern American society.  He is an occasional political and cultural commentator for The Independent.

His published work has explored subjects such as the KKK, the progressive era, and U.S. deportation policy.

Selected works 
 Race, Radicalism, Religion and Restriction: Immigration in the Pacific Northwest, 1890-1924. Praeger, 2003
 Beyond the Huddled Masses: American Immigration and the Treaty of Versailles. IB Tauris, 2006
 The Progressive Era in the USA 1890 - 1921. Ashgate, 2007
 Crime and the Rise of Modern America. Routledge, 2011
 Organized Crime in the United States, 1865-1941. McFarland, 2018

References

External links
 Allerfeldt's profile at the University of Exeter

Living people
Year of birth missing (living people)
British historians
Academics of the University of Exeter